is a railway station in the city of Fuji, Shizuoka Prefecture, Japan, operated by the Central Japan Railway Company (JR Tōkai ).

Lines

Station layout
Higashi-Tagonoura Station has a single side platform serving Track 1 and an island platform serving Track 2 and Track 3, connected to the station building by a footbridge. Track 2 is used for through transit of express trains, as is Track 4 (without platform) to the outside of Track 3.  The station is staffed.

Platforms

Adjacent stations

|-
!colspan=5|Central Japan Railway Company

History
Higashi-Tagonoura Station was opened on September 15, 1949 primarily as a commuter station serving workers for nearby heavy industry.

Station numbering was introduced to the section of the Tōkaidō Line operated JR Central in March 2018; Higashi-Tagonoura Station was assigned station number CA06.

Passenger statistics
In fiscal 2017, the station was used by an average of 1430 passengers daily (boarding passengers only).

Surrounding area
Japan National Route 1

See also
 List of Railway Stations in Japan

References

Yoshikawa, Fumio. Tokaido-sen 130-nen no ayumi. Grand-Prix Publishing (2002) .

External links

Railway stations in Shizuoka Prefecture
Tōkaidō Main Line
Railway stations in Japan opened in 1949
Stations of Central Japan Railway Company
Fuji, Shizuoka